Monument Mountain is a  long quartzite ridgeline located in Great Barrington and Stockbridge, Massachusetts in the Berkshires geology. Beside the high point, the mountain has several distinct features, most notably the open, knife-edge Peeskawso Peak,  located on the southeast side of the mountain within the  Monument Mountain reservation managed by The Trustees of Reservations. The mountain receives over 20,000 visitors per year.

Devil's Pulpit, part of Peeskawso Peak, is a free-standing pillar of stone. Flag Rock, located on the southwest side of the mountain, is an open ledge overlooking the village of Housatonic. The only official trails on the mountain ascend Peeskawso Peak from a parking lot on Massachusetts Route 7 north of Great Barrington center. There is no fee for members of The Trustees and a parking fee of $5 for non-members. An unnamed waterfall is located to the northeast of Peeskawso Peak along the Hickey Trail.

Views from Peeskawso Peak include the Housatonic River Valley, The Berkshires, the Taconic Mountains, and the Catskill Mountains of New York.

The west side of Monument Mountain drains into the Housatonic River thence into Long Island Sound. The east side of Monument Mountain drains into Konkapot Brook thence into the Housatonic River.

References

External links

 Monument Mountain The Trustees of Reservations
 Trail map

Great Barrington, Massachusetts
Mountains of Berkshire County, Massachusetts
Rock formations of Massachusetts
Stockbridge, Massachusetts